The Battle of Thanesar (1710) was one among a series of battles fought between Firuz Khan Mewati and Binod Singh as he was ordered by the Mughal Imperial government to chastise the Sikh rebellion. It resulted in a victory for the Mughals as Firuz Khan Mewati cleared Thanesar, in northern India.

Aftermath 
Firuz Khan after clearing Thanesar would move onto Shahabad Markanda, ten miles further to the north, which was also taken by the Mughals. Therefore, Firuz Khan won all four engagements with Binod Singh. Hundreds of Sikhs who were made prisoner were strung up by Firuz to the road-side trees, their long hair being twisted to perform the office of a rope. Firuz Khan was awarded the Faujdari of Sirhind.

References 

Thanesar
Sikh Empire
History of India
1710 in Asia
1710 in military history